Charles Clarence Neslen (April 17, 1879 – December 7, 1967) was the 19th mayor of Salt Lake City, Utah from 1920 to 1928.

From 1913 to 1938, Neslen was also the bishop of the 20th Ward of the Church of Jesus Christ of Latter-day Saints (LDS Church), which was located in the Avenues area of Salt Lake City.

Neslen was raised in Salt Lake City.  From 1902 to 1904 he was a Mormon missionary in Germany.  During his mission, most Mormon missionaries were banished from Germany and he was imprisoned in Danzig.  He served as president of the Königsberg District of the LDS Church for a part of his mission.

Neslen was a member of the Democratic Party and a delegate to the Democratic National Convention in 1912.  

Neslen worked a total of 15 years for the Deseret News.  He was also a realtor and for a time served as secretary of the Salt Lake Real Estate Association.  

On October 26, 1905, Neslen married Grace T. Cannon, a daughter of George Q. Cannon.  They had five children. Following the death of Grace on June 20, 1950, Nelsen married Julia Paxman Sloan.

Neslen's half-sister, Florence Neslen, was the mother of Richard L. Evans, an apostle in the LDS Church.

Notes

References 
 Jenson, Andrew. Latter-day Saint Biographical Encyclopedia, vol. 2, p. 520

1879 births
1967 deaths
20th-century Mormon missionaries
American Mormon missionaries in Germany
American leaders of the Church of Jesus Christ of Latter-day Saints
American people imprisoned abroad
Cannon family
Mayors of Salt Lake City
Prisoners and detainees of Germany
Utah Democrats